Elections to Lambeth London Borough Council were held in May 1982.  The whole council was up for election. Turnout was 40.1%.

Election result

|}

Ward results

References

1982
1982 London Borough council elections
May 1982 events in the United Kingdom
20th century in the London Borough of Lambeth